Smile is the debut studio album by American heavy metal band Cane Hill, released on July 15, 2016 through Rise Records.

Track listing

Personnel
Cane Hill
 Elijah Witt – lead vocals
 James Barnett – guitars
 Ryan Henriquez – bass
 Devin Clark – drums, percussion
Production
 Drew Fulk – production, recording, mixing, mastering
 Jeff Dunne – engineering, mixing, mastering

Charts

References

2016 debut albums
Cane Hill (band) albums
Rise Records albums